{{DISPLAYTITLE:Rhaetian Railway Ge 4/4 III}}

The Rhaetian Railway Ge 4/4 III is a class of metre gauge Bo′Bo′ electric locomotives of the Rhaetian Railway (RhB), which is the main railway network in the Canton of Graubünden, Switzerland.

The class is so named because it was the third class of locomotives of the Swiss locomotive and railcar classification type Ge 4/4 to be acquired by the Rhaetian Railway. According to that classification system, Ge 4/4 denotes a narrow gauge electric adhesion locomotive with a total of four axles, all of which are drive axles.

History
In order to manage the sharp increase in traffic on its network after the opening of the Vereina Tunnel, the Rhaetian Railway joined in 1989 with Swiss Locomotive and Machine Works and ASEA Brown Boveri, to develop a new generation of electric locomotives, the drive train of which was to be based upon AC technology with GTO Thyristors.  The original plan for a six axle variant of the Ge 4/4 II, which would have had benefits on the nearly straight section of line through the tunnel, was rejected, in favour of a universally deployable locomotive with four axles, which could also be used on sections with tight radius curves.  The result was the Ge 4/4 III class.

On 7 December 1993, the first Ge 4/4 III machine, no 641, was officially put into service.  Between 1994 and 1999, eleven further locomotives followed, in three series, and were given numbers 642 to 652.  The first of these further orders, made in 1989, consisted of six locomotives, and the second further order, in 1990, was for three.  The third, placed with Adtranz in 1996, was intended to cover the additional demand due to the opening of the Vereina Tunnel, and was for another three machines.

The Ge 4/4 IIIs are now found at the head of almost all of the train sets on the Albula Railway, and they are the only locomotives used to haul car trains through the Vereina Tunnel.  All of the locomotives in the class are currently decorated with colourful advertising liveries.

Accidents and incidents

On 13 August 2014, No. 651 was hauling a passenger train that was struck by a landslide and derailed at Tiefencastel, Graubünden. Eleven people were injured.

Technical details
Their control technology corresponds almost completely with that of the SBB-CFF-FFS Re 460 class of locomotive.

The 12 locomotives were given names of small communities in Graubünden, on the territory of which the Rhaetian Railway operates.  Depending upon the livery applied to each particular locomotive, the names are applied at various places on the right and left sides of the vehicle, with the traffic number between 641 and 652 applied to each front end, and also on the lower sides.  Beside the name on each locomotive is also the emblem of the particular place.

Similar locomotives operate also on the Bière–Apples–Morges Railway (BAM), (French: Chemin de fer Bière-Apples-Morges), as Ge 4/4 Nos. 21 and 22, as well as on the Montreux-Oberland Bernois (MOB) Railway, (French: Chemin de fer Montreux-Oberland bernois), as Ge 4/4 Nos. 8001–8004.

List of locomotives
The following locomotives in the class are in operation on the Rhaetian Railway:

Gallery

See also

 History of rail transport in Switzerland
 Rail transport in Switzerland

References

Further reading 

 
 
 

This article is based upon a translation from the German language version as at December 2009.

SLM locomotives
ABB locomotives
Adtranz locomotives
Bo′Bo′ locomotives
Electric locomotives of Switzerland
11 kV AC locomotives
Rhaetian Railway locomotives
Railway locomotives introduced in 1993
Metre gauge electric locomotives